The Romanian Air Force (RoAF) is the air force branch of the Romanian Armed Forces. It has an air force headquarters, an operational command, five airbases and an air defense brigade. Reserve forces include one air base and three airfields.

In 2022, the Romanian Air Force employed 11,700 personnel.

Current state

The Romanian Air Force modernized 110 MiG-21 LanceRs, in cooperation with Israel between 1993 and 2002. Today, 23-28 of these MiG 21 LanceRs are operational. The Romanian Air Force also operates C-130 Hercules, C-27J Spartan and An-26 transport airplanes and IAR-330 Puma helicopters. IAR-330 PUMA SOCAT helicopters have been modernized by the Romanian Aviation Industry in cooperation with Elbit Systems (Israel) for attack missions. The Romanian Air Force also includes locally built IAR-99 Șoim jet planes, in general only used for training of the young pilots. 

Due to the old age of the MiGs, the Romanian Air Force is in the process of procurement of new fighters or possibly used fighters from partner states. Romania has signed a contract in 2013 with Portugal for 12 F-16 A/B Block 15 MLU fighters. The first six fighters have entered service with the Romanian Air Force in September 2016, another three have been delivered in November and the last three have entered service in 2017. Romania signed a contract in 2019 with Portugal for another 5 F-16 A/B Block 15 MLU fighters, which were delivered until March 2021.

It was announced in December 2021 that a deal for 32 F-16 A/B Block 20 fighters from Norway was being finalized. The contract, amounting to €388 million, was officially signed on 4 November 2022. The first delivery of Norwegian F-16s is set for 2023, while a second delivery is set for 2024. Under the contract, the F-16s will undergo the modification to the M6.5.2 Romanian configuration with US support before delivery. Kongsberg Aviation Maintenance Services will provide support, maintenance and training of Romanian technical personnel.

On 2 February 2022, the President of Romania stated intent to purchase the fifth-generation F-35 joint strike fighter as part of its Air Force modernization, which plans to spend a total of 9.8 billion euro until 2026 to boost its defense capabilities. According to the Minister of Defence, Romania plans to start the F-35 acquisition procedure in 2032.

On 23 May, the MiG-21 LanceRs resumed flights after being suspended on 15 April 2022. The LanceR will continue to fly for a period of one year, until 13 May 2023 after which they will be replaced by the F-16s purchased from Norway.

The current chief of the Romanian Air Force Staff, succeeding Major General Laurian Anastasof on 11 October 2017, is Lieutenant General Viorel Pană.

History

Beginnings
In 1818, during the reign of John Caradja, the prince of Wallachia, an unmanned hot air balloon was flown off Dealul Spirii in Bucharest. On , Marius Willemot, the owner of the hydrogen balloon named "Mihai Bravul" flew together with Majors Iacob Lahovary, Constantin Poenaru and Dumitrescu over Bucharest. The balloon had made its first flight at Paris on 27 March of the same year.

On 20 November 1909 the Chitila Piloting School was formed as a joint venture by Mihail Cerchez. The school, conducted by French flight instructors, had five hangars, bleachers for spectators and workshops where the Farman airplanes were built under license. The school opened on 9 July 1910, when the chief flight instructor and director of the school René Guillemin crashed a Farman III biplane from a height of  during a demonstration flight and broke his leg.

Guillemin was succeeded by Michel-Paul Molla who made the first flight across Bucharest on 7 September 1910. Molla was succeeded by two others before the school closed in late 1912 due to financial difficulties, having trained six officers, but only licensed two.

In November 1909, the Romanian Minister of War commissioned Aurel Vlaicu to build the A. Vlaicu I airplane at the Bucharest Army Arsenal which first flew on 17 June 1910. On 28 September during the Fall military exercise, Vlaicu flew his airplane from Slatina to Piatra Olt carrying a message, Romania thus becoming one of the first countries to use airplanes for military purposes. Along with other Romanian pilots, Vlaicu flew reconnaissance missions during the Second Balkan War. Vlaicu III, the first metal aircraft in the world, was completed after his death, in May 1914.

World War I

On the eve of Romania's entrance in the war in August 1916, only 24 out of the 44 aircraft that had been imported and assembled at RGA were available. Another 20 aircraft were provided by the flight schools. The total of 44 aircraft included: 10 Bristol T.B.8, 7 Bristol Coanda Monoplanes, 5 Blériot XI, 4 Farman HF.20, 8 Farman MF.7 and MF.11, 4 Voisin III, 4 Morane-Saulnier monoplanes, 1 Caudron G.3 and 1 Aviatik C.I. Added to these were two native-made monoplanes designed by Aurel Vlaicu. One of the Vlaicu monoplanes, A Vlaicu II, crashed in 1913, while the A Vlaicu I was retired in 1914, leaving A Vlaicu III as the sole Romanian-made aircraft in the Romanian Air Corps.

During World War I, Romania acquired 322 aircraft from France and ex-RNAS aircraft from Great Britain including Nieuport 11 and 17 single seat fighters and Morane-Saulnier LA and Nieuport 12 two seat fighters, Caudron G.3, Henry Farman HF.20, Farman MF.11, and Farman F.40 & 46 artillery observation and reconnaissance aircraft, Caudron G.4, Breguet-Michelin BLM and Voisin LA bombers. On 16 September 1916, a Romanian Farman F.40 downed an Imperial German Air Service aircraft near Slobozia; this was the first Romanian aerial victory. By the end of World War I, Romanian pilots had flown about 11,000 hours and 750 missions; however, it was unable to prevent the December 1916 Romanian offensive at the Battle of the Argeș from being defeated, which resulted in the occupation of southern Romania, and the armistice on 6 December 1917 following the Russian revolution.

World War II

When Romania, allied with Nazi Germany, went to war against the Soviet Union on 22 June 1941, the Romanian Air Force had 621 airplanes, including its locally made fighter IAR 80/81. The air force accomplished hundreds of missions, contributing to Romania's recapture of Northern Bucovina and Bessarabia, which had been occupied by the Soviet Union a year earlier. By the end of the Siege of Odessa, the Romanian military fighters claimed about 600 air victories. Romanian Military Aviation fought on the Eastern Front until 22 August 1944, bringing an important contribution to the great battles at Stalingrad, in Crimea, and the Ukrainian fronts. Between 1941 and 1944, Romanian aircraft won 2,000 air victories. The most famous flying aces were Captain Prince Constantin Cantacuzino, who gained 69 certified victories, Captain Alexandru Șerbănescu, who shot down 60 enemy airplanes, and Captain Horia Agarici.

In the aftermath of King Michael's Coup of 23 August 1944, Romania turned against Germany and joined the Allies.

Cold War

Starting with 1948, Romania tailored its military to Soviet concepts and doctrine. On 15 February 1949, the Aviation Command was established based on the Soviet model (regiments instead of flotillas). In the following years, new Soviet aircraft, such as Yakovlev Yak-18, Polikarpov Po-2, Lavochkin La-9, Tupolev Tu-2, and Ilyushin Il-10 entered service. In 1951, 9 Yakovlev Yak-17s and Yak-23s entered the air force, and in 1952, other 88 aircraft: MiG-15 and MiG-17. In 1958, the first supersonic fighter MiG-19 entered the inventory. Three years later, in February 1962, a new fighter was added to the inventory, MiG-21, which represented one of the most effective fighters of that time.

Starting with 1974, Romanian-made aircraft supplemented the already existing jets. The Romanian IAR-93 attack aircraft flew its first flight on 31 October 1974. It represented a great step forward taking into account that it was the only jet fighter not made by the Soviets, the only one ever manufactured and operated by a Warsaw Pact country.

In 1962, the first helicopter subunits were established and followed later on, in 1965, by the first Soviet Mi-2 and Mi-4 helicopters. From 1968, Mi-8 helicopters will also enter service. Renewing the aircraft fleet process went on with the first 2 MiG-23s arriving on 23 January 1979.

On 14 May 1981, at 20:16, Soviet spaceship Soyuz-40 was launched from Baikonur to perform a common Romanian-Soviet flight, with Lieutenant Dumitru Prunariu and Colonel Leonid Popov as commander on board. During the early 1980s, 67th Fighter-Bomber Regiment and 49th Fighter-Bomber Regiment from Craiova and Ianca were equipped with new IAR-93s, which replaced old MiG-15s and MiG-17s. In December 1989, just a few days before the Romanian revolution against communism began, MiG-29 aircraft entered the Air Force inventory. Initially 45 MiG-29s were ordered but only 21 were delivered, with the rest of the order being cancelled. The MiG-29s were assigned to the 2nd and 3rd Squadrons of the 57th Fighter Regiment located at the Mihail Kogălniceanu Airport.

Post-1990

In 1990, the last MiG-15 fighters were retired from the 49th Aviation Regiment, located at Ianca. In 1992, production of the IAR-93 was stopped following the start of the Yugoslav Civil Wars. The last IAR-93s were retired in 1998. By 1 June 1995 the Air Force dropped the communist era regimental system in favor of a system consisting of Air Bases, Groups and Squadrons.

Due to financial constraints, being unable to purchase new fighers, the Romanian Air Force decided to invest in the upgrade of the MiG-21 fighters. Following a competition between several companies, the Israeli company Elbit was chosen, and the MiG-21M and MF/MF-75 versions were selected. The program was originally called the "DD program" as a tribute to the fighter pilot and writer Doru Davidovici, who died in a MiG-21 crash in 1989. The upgrade program was later renamed to "Lancer", designated as "LanceR" with capital "R" in Romania. The first flight of an upgraded MiG, a LanceR 'A' ground attack variant, took place on 22 August 1995. 

The Romanian MiG-29 fleet was also intended to undergo modernization under a project named "Sniper" done by DASA, Aerostar and Elbit. The first flight took place on 5 May 2000 and the prototype was presented at ILA 2000. However, the modernization project was canceled due to various reasons and the MiG-29s were retired.

Following its entry into the Partnership for Peace program in 1994, Romania started cooperating with other countries with the goal of eventually joining NATO. For this, Romanian Air Force aircraft participated in many local or abroad exercises and airshows. Before joining NATO, the 86th Group at Borcea started to convert into a NATO compatible unit by making improvements to the base's infrastructure, allowing its pilots to fly a fair amount of training hours and work according to NATO procedures.

During the period of reorganization, starting from the year 2000, other aircraft models such as the MiG-23 fighters, the Harbin H-5 bombers and the IAR-823 and L-39 Albatros trainers were retired, the latter of which was retired in 2007. Along with the retiring of airplanes, several bases were disbanded as well, including the Alexeni Airfield, the 49th Air Base from Ianca and the 91st Air Base from Deveselu. The 93rd Air Base from Timișoara was also disbanded and currently serves as an annex to the 71st Air Base.

In the spring of 2009, the Romanian government decided to purchase VSHORAD/SHORAD systems from France. The deal included Mistral MANPADS and MICA VL surface-to-air missiles. However, after preliminary talks with MBDA in August, the deal was put on hold and canceled afterwards because of the defense cuts.

In February 2010, the Supreme Council of National Defense signed an agreement with the United States for missile defence under whose terms land-based SM-3 systems would be installed in Romania. On 3 May 2011, the president of Romania Traian Băsescu announced the location for the SM-3 systems: former Air Force base Deveselu in Olt County. The system includes 3 batteries with 24 SM-3 Block I rockets, manned by approximately 200 US soldiers (with a maximum of 500) under Romanian Air Force overall command. The Deveselu Aegis Ashore site has been declared operational on 13 May 2016.

2007 Baltic Air Policing
Four MiG-21 LanceR Cs were deployed from August–November 2007 at Šiauliai, in Lithuania for Baltic Air Policing. The Romanian detachment succeeded the French Air Force Mirage 2000Cs of Escadron de Chasse 01.012 from Cambrai, which fulfilled the Baltic Air Policing since May 2007. Once the RoAF finished its three-month stint, a Portuguese Air Force detachment took over the mission.

The four aircraft and most of the staff came from the 71st Air Base. A total of 67 personnel, among them nine pilots, were part of the detachment: 63 served at Šiauliai, while other four served at the air traffic control centre in Kaunas, to ensure smooth cooperation with local authorities. The Romanian detachment attracted attention from the local media, not least from the fact that it was only the second time a fighter from the Soviet era deployed to Šiauliai – Polish Air Force MiG-29s had also been deployed there in 2006.

2022 Russian Invasion of Ukraine
On the starting day of the Russian invasion of Ukraine, two F-16s from the 53rd Fighter Squadron were sent to intercept a Sukhoi Su-27 of the Ukrainian Air Force that was approaching Romanian airspace. The Su-27 was escorted to the 95th Air Base where the pilot was taken by Romanian authorities. The Ukrainian Minister of Defence, Oleksiy Reznikov, quickly apologized for this event and requested the return of the airplane and its pilot. After a maintenance team from Ukraine fixed the technical issues of the fighter, the aircraft was returned without its weapons on 1 March, being escorted by two MiG-21 LanceRs to the border where other Ukrainian airplanes took over.

On 2 March 2022, a MiG-21 LanceR was lost while on an air patrol inside Romanian airspace near Cogealac, 60 miles from the Ukrainian border. This "occurred amid increased air police missions in Romania after the Russian invasion of Ukraine." An IAR 330 on a search and rescue mission for the missing MiG-21 crashed with seven fatalities. The eight servicemen who died in the two accidents were posthumously promoted and decorated by the president of Romania. Shortly after, fake news claiming that the Romanian MiG was shot down by Ukrainian S-300 missile systems appeared. These claims were officially refuted. The preliminary analysis published on 23 March showed that the crashes occurred due to human and environmental factors.

As of 13 December, Romanian Air Force and allied aircraft took part in more than 150 air policing missions since the start of Russia's invasion. The majority of the missions involved Russian aircraft approaching Romanian airspace. Other missions involved coordinating civilian aircraft which had reported bomb threats or after their communications were interrupted.

Structure

Air Force General Staff
The Romanian Air Force General Staff represents the military concept-developing, command and executive structure providing Air Forces peacetime, crisis and wartime leadership in order to reach, maintain and increase, as required, the operational level of the military subordinated structures so that to be able to operate under authorized commands responsible for military operations planning and conduct.

Generate, mobilize, structure, equip, operationalize and regenerate the required forces, provide the logistic support necessary to conduct military operations and based on higher orders, take over both the Joint Operation Air Component and independent air operations command and control, through the Main Air Operational Center. Starting with 1 July 2010, the Romanian Air Force bases were renamed to Air Flotillas. The names were kept until 1 December 2013, when they were changed back to Air Bases.

Units 

The current structure of the Romanian Air Force is as follows:

 57th Air Base "Mihail Kogălniceanu"
 57th Air Base, at Constanța – Mihail Kogălniceanu IAP
861st Combat Aviation Squadron, with MiG-21 LanceR C/B
572nd Helicopter Squadron, with IAR-330M (MEDEVAC)
  71st Air Base "General Emanoil Ionescu"
71st Air Base, Câmpia Turzii military airfield
711th Combat Aviation Squadron, with MiG-21 LanceR C/B
713th Combat Helicopter Squadron, with IAR-330 SOCAT
71st Air Base annex, at Timișoara – Giarmata IAP
712th Helicopter Squadron, with IAR-330L/M (MEDEVAC)
 86th Air Base "Locotenent Aviator Gheorghe Mociorniță"
86th Air Base, in Fetești – Borcea military airfield
 53rd Fighter Squadron, with F-16AM/BM Block 15 MLU
 90th Airlift Base "Comandor Aviator Gheorghe Bănciulescu"
90th Airlift Base, at Bucharest – Otopeni IAP
901st Tactical Air Transport Squadron, with C-130B/H Hercules
902nd Operational Air Transport and Aerophotogrametric Squadron, with C-27J Spartan and An-30
903rd Transport Helicopter Squadron, with IAR-330L/M
  95th Air Base "Erou Căpitan Aviator Alexandru Șerbănescu"
95th Air Base, at Bacău IAP
 951st Advanced Air Training Squadron, with IAR-99 Șoim
 952nd Combat Helicopter Squadron, with IAR-330 SOCAT
142nd Reconnaissance Squadron, with Shadow 600 UAVs, at Timișoara – Giarmata IAP

 70th Engineering Centre, in Bucharest
 85th Air Signals and IT Centre "General Doroftei Ghermănescu", in Bucharest
 11th Surface-to-air Missile Regiment "Horea", in Brașov
 74th Patriot Regiment, in Mihai Bravu
 1st Surface-to-air Missile Brigade "General Nicolae Dăscălescu", in Bucharest
 1st Surface-to-air Missile Battalion "Voievodul Mihai"
 2nd Surface-to-air Missile Battalion
 3rd Surface-to-air Missile Battalion "Codrii Vlăsiei"
 4th Surface-to-air Missile Battalion "Colonel Mircea Aelenei"
 5th Surface-to-air Missile Battalion "Horea"
 6th Surface-to-air Missile Battalion "Șoimii Bărăganului"
 7th Hawk Battalion
  91st Logistic Base "General Aviator Andrei Popovici", in Bucharest
  99th Military Base Deveselu, in Deveselu
Air Operations Centre, in Bucharest
 2nd Airspace Surveillance Centre "North", at 71st Air Base, in Câmpia Turzii
 Radar Station, in Ovidiu, with AN/FPS-117(V)
 Radar Station, at Giarmata Airport with AN/FPS-117(V)
 Radar Station, in Suceava, with AN/FPS-117(V)
 Radar Station, in Craiova, with AN/FPS-117(V)
 Civil/Military Radar Station, in Bârnova, with AN/FPS-117(V)
  Air Force Academy "Henri Coandă", in Brașov
Air Force Personnel Training and Formation Air Base
 Air Force Application School "Aurel Vlaicu", Boboc military airfield
1st Air Training Squadron AI-A Phase, with IAK-52 and IAR 316B
2nd Air Training Squadron AII-A Phase, with IAR 99 Standard
Air Force NCO and Specialists School "Traian Vuia", Boboc military airfield
 Capu Midia Surface-to-air Training and Air-to-Surface Shooting Range

Reserve air bases 

 93rd Air Base, at Giarmata Airport

Capu Midia Training Range 

The Capu Midia Surface-to-air Training and Air-to-Surface Shooting Range provides firing training, execution and evaluation facilities.

Aircraft

Current inventory 
 

Note: Three C-17 Globemaster III's and five RQ-4D's are available through the Heavy Airlift Wing, and Alliance Ground Surveillance programs

Air Defense 
The Romanian Air Force also has several anti-aircraft systems:

Aircraft markings
The Romanian roundel uses the colours of the Romanian flag. It is used on Romanian Armed Forces vehicles and Romanian Air Force aircraft.

Ranks and insignia

Officers

Enlisted

See also
Romanian Armed Forces
Romanian Land Forces
Romanian Naval Forces
Romanian Naval Aviation
Military aviation

References

Notes

Footnotes

Bibliography

 (bilingual Romanian/English)

External links

Official site of the Romanian Air Force
Official site of the Romanian Ministry of National Defense (MoND)
Order of Battle of the RoAF

 
Air forces by country